Grace Yun Peng (born 15 July 1974) is a former international badminton player from China, who later represented the United States.

Early life 
On July 15, 1974, Peng was born in Guangxi, China.

Career
At age 10, Peng started training in badminton in China.
Peng began her career in the U.S. on September 25, 2004. In the US Open 2004
she finished as a semifinalist in the mixed doubles and as a quarter-finalist in the women's doubles. She has won the US Open on two occasions: once in 2005 the women's doubles with her partner Johanna Lee and again in 2008 the mixed doubles crown with partner Halim Haryanto.

References

External links 
 
 Yun Peng at bwfbadminton.com

1974 births
Living people
Badminton players from Guangxi
Chinese female badminton players
Chinese emigrants to the United States
American sportspeople of Chinese descent
American female badminton players
21st-century American women